Puget-Théniers is a commune in the Alpes-Maritimes department in southeastern France.

Geography
It is situated on in the valley of the Var.

History
It was part of the historic County of Nice until 1860 as Poggetto Tenieri.

Personalities
It is the birthplace of Auguste Blanqui, Jean-Pierre Papon and Aimé Teisseire.

Population

See also
Communes of the Alpes-Maritimes department

References

External links

 Puget-Théniers Tourist Information
  & (Occitan) Dance and traditional music from Puget-Théniers.

Communes of Alpes-Maritimes
Alpes-Maritimes communes articles needing translation from French Wikipedia